Joachim Thomassen (born 4 May 1988) is a Norwegian footballer currently playing for the Norwegian side Sarpsborg 08.

Club

Thomassen started his youth career with Sarpsborg FK before joining Sparta Sarpsborg in 2007. In January 2008, he joined Fredrikstad and played his first game for the club against Kongsvinger. In May 2009, he signed a contract extension for Fredrikstad until 2012. In November 2011, he was rumored to join the Seattle Sounders FC of Major League Soccer.
Before the 2012 season, he signed a contract with Vålerenga.
After two seasons with Vålerenga he signed for Sarpsborg 08 FF ahead of the 2014 season.

Career statistics

Club

International

Thomassen has played for the Norway national under-17 football team, Under-19 team, and Under -21 team.

References

1988 births
Living people
Norwegian footballers
Norway under-21 international footballers
Norway youth international footballers
Sarpsborg 08 FF players
Fredrikstad FK players
Vålerenga Fotball players
Eliteserien players
Norwegian First Division players
People from Sarpsborg
Association football defenders
Sportspeople from Viken (county)